Bash-Khynysly (also, Bash-Khanysly and Bash-Khanysty) is a village in the Shamakhi Rayon of Azerbaijan.

References 

Populated places in Shamakhi District